Chamaemelum nobile, commonly known as chamomile (also spelled camomile), is a low perennial plant found in dry fields and around gardens and cultivated grounds in Europe, North America, and South America. Its synonym is Anthemis nobilis, with various common names, such as Roman chamomile, English chamomile, garden chamomile, ground apple, low chamomile, mother's daisy or whig plant. C. nobile is a source of the herbal product known as chamomile using dried flowers for flavoring teas or as a fragrance used in aromatherapy. Chamomile has no established medicinal properties.

Description
Chamaemelum nobile has daisy-like white flowers and procumbent stems; the leaves are alternate, bipinnate, finely dissected, and downy to glabrous. The flowering time in the Northern Hemisphere is June and July, and its fragrance is sweet, crisp, fruity and herbaceous. Although the plant is often confused with German chamomile (Matricaria chamomilla), its morphology, properties and chemical composition are markedly different.

Etymology 
The word chamomile and the genus name Chamaemelum derive from the Greek χαμαίμηλον (chamaimēlon), "earth-apple", from χαμαί (chamai), "on the ground" + μήλον (mēlon), "apple", so-called because of the apple-like scent of the plant.

The plant obtained the name "nobile" (Latin "noble" ) because of its putative therapeutic properties, which were believed to be better than those of the German chamomile (Matricaria chamomilla L.).

History 
Roman chamomile (C. nobile L.) has a history of use in traditional medicine since the Middle Ages. The European cultivation of the plant started in England in the 16th century. The plant was listed first in the pharmacopoeia of Würtenberg as a carminative, painkiller, diuretic and digestive aid. Joachim Camerarius was the first to discover and name chamaemelum nobile in 1598 in Rome. In Egypt, chamaemelum nobile was used as a symbol of dedication to their gods.

Conservation 
Chamaemelum nobile is listed as least concern on the Red List but the plant population trend in the UK is decreasing at a significant rate. This decline in the Chamaemelum nobile population was caused by the drainage of wet grasslands, decrease in grazing, and the reduction of pasture that was used as arable fields. There is speculation that wild plant collecting could also be a cause of this species population decline.

Although the species population is declining there are a few plants placed in at least one land and water protected area. There are no educational awareness programs, international legislations, or international management for this species.

Uses

Extracts or dried flowers of Chamaemelum nobile are used in hair care and skincare products. The plant may be used to flavor foods, in herbal teas, perfumes, and cosmetics. It is used in aromatherapy in the belief it is a calming agent to reduce stress and promote sleep. Chamomile essential oil contains sesquiterpenes, terpene lactones (including the blue compound, chamazulene), acetylene derivatives, and polyphenols, which contribute to the fragrance and may be extracted individually.

It can be used to create a fragrant chamomile lawn. A chamomile lawn needs light soil, adequate moisture, and sun to thrive. Each square meter contains 83–100 plants. The lawn is only suitable to light foot traffic or in places where mower access is difficult.

Folk medicine and adverse effects
Although used in folk medicine, there is no scientific evidence it has any medicinal uses. Alternative medicine practices approved in Germany include use of chamomile as a topical medication or inhalant for mouth and respiratory tract irritations.

Chamomile is likely unsafe for use during pregnancy, and its topical use for skin disorders may cause contact dermatitis. There are no known interactions with prescription drugs. Consuming chamomile tea may adversely affect anticoagulant drugs.

Other names
The plant has diverse common names, among which Roman chamomile or sweet chamomile are used during the 21st century.

References

Anthemideae
Herbs
Plants described in 1753
Taxa named by Carl Linnaeus